Soulby is a village and civil parish near Kirkby Stephen, in the county of Cumbria, England

Soulby may also refer to:

Soulby, Dacre a hamlet in the civil parish of Dacre in the county of Cumbria, England
William Soulby, a 14th Century English Member of Parliament who has been murdered

See also
Sulby (disambiguation)
Soulby Fell, a hill in the Lake District, England
Soulbury, Aylesbury Vale, Buckinghamshire, England